Mortad is a village in Nizamabad district in the state of Telangana in India.

Geography

Coordinates- 18°82′N 78°48′E Coordinates: 18°82′N 78°48′E.

Demographics

♦ Total population of Mortad Mandal is 56,376 living in 13,119 Houses, Spread across total 19 villages and 18 panchayats . Males are 27,410 and Females are 28,966

♦ Total population of Mortad town is 11965. Males are 5,842 and Females are 6,123 with 2693 living Houses.

References

Villages in Nizamabad district